Centrepoint is a four-part British television thriller, written by Nigel Williams and directed by Piers Haggard, first broadcast on Channel 4 on 8 October 1990. The series, which loosely retells the story of Hamlet, is set in London's Docklands at the time of its commercial development, and stars Jonathan Firth as Roland Wareing, whose father Nick has been missing for several years, presumed dead. However, when a mysterious telephone caller suggests that Nick may not be dead after all, Roland sets out to discover the truth behind the disappearance.

The series initially broadcast at 10:00pm on Mondays for four consecutive weeks, although was later re-edited from four episodes into two and rebroadcast on 9 and 16 May 1992. The series was described by Broadcast magazine as “an expensive fiasco in which ambition far outstretched ability”, and was listed among the worst programmes ever broadcast on Channel 4 in a press pack issued to celebrate the channel's 20th Anniversary in 2002. Subsequently, the series remains commercially unreleased on either VHS or DVD.

Cast
 Jonathan Firth as Roland Wareing
 Murray Head as Nick Wareing
 Cheryl Campbell as Maria Wareing
 Bob Peck as Armstrong
 John Shrapnel as Claud Wareing
 Abigail Cruttenden as Saskia
 Veronica Quilligan as Lulu
 Sian Ellis as Roland Wareing (Baby)
 David Stevenson as Roland Wareing (Age 10)
 Derrick O'Connor as Dum Dum
 Patrick Fierry as Ralph
 Jennifer Bryce as Claudia
 Joanna Clarke	as Harriet
 Adrian Dunbar as Brown
 Phillip Dogham as Guido
 Roger McKern as Katangai

Episodes

References

External links

1990 British television series debuts
1990 British television series endings
1990s British drama television series
1990s British television miniseries
Channel 4 television dramas
Channel 4 miniseries
English-language television shows
Television shows set in London